Panáček (feminine: Panáčková) is a Czech surname. Notable people with the surname include:

 Jan Panáček (born 1970), Czech cyclist
 Josef Panáček (1937–2022), Czech sport shooter
 Marek Panáček (born 2002), Czech squash player

See also
 

Czech-language surnames